Colin Webster (17 July 1932 – 1 March 2001) was a Welsh footballer and Wales international. A striker, he played his club football for Manchester United, Swansea Town and Newport County and was part of the Wales squad for the 1958 FIFA World Cup in Sweden.

Club career
Webster began his career at his home town club Cardiff City but, despite playing regularly for the reserve side while also working as a part-time motor fitter, he was unable to break into the first team. He was later brought to the attention of Manchester United by Jimmy Murphy and signed for the club in May 1952.

He was playing for Manchester United at the time of the Munich air disaster on 6 February 1958, but did not travel with the team due to ill health. He remained at the club for one year after the tragedy and played in the 1958 FA Cup Final, collecting a runners-up medal as United were defeated by Bolton Wanderers. In 1958, he moved to Swansea Town for a fee of £7,5000 where he spent five years, finishing as top scorer for the club in the 1959–60 and 1960–61 seasons and winning the Welsh Cup in 1961.

Webster finished his professional career in 1964 with Newport County, later playing non-league football for Worcester City and Merthyr Tydfil.

International career
Webster made his debut for Wales on 1 May 1957 in a 1–0 win over Czechoslovakia. The following year, he was named as part of the Wales squad for the 1958 FIFA World Cup. He played in 1–1 draws against Hungary and Mexico during the group stages and later replaced the injured John Charles in the quarter-final against Brazil, missing an easy chance to level the score and thus ensuring Wales's elimination.

After retirement
Webster later ran a scaffolding business and later spent nine years working as a park ranger in Swansea. After breaking his leg in a fall, Webster took early retirement. He died from lung cancer on 1 March 2001 at the age of 68.

Honours
Manchester United
Football League First Division (1): 1955–56

Swansea Town
Welsh Cup (1): 1960–61

References

1932 births
2001 deaths
Footballers from Cardiff
Cardiff City F.C. players
Welsh footballers
Manchester United F.C. players
Swansea City A.F.C. players
Newport County A.F.C. players
Worcester City F.C. players
Merthyr Tydfil F.C. players
Wales international footballers
1958 FIFA World Cup players
English Football League players
Deaths from cancer in Wales
Association football inside forwards
FA Cup Final players